Folkish may refer to:
Folk culture, in the sense "of the common people; traditional, sophisticated, yet unconventional"
Völkisch movement of German ethnic nationalism

See also

Folk (disambiguation)
Volk (disambiguation)
Vulgar (disambiguation)